Peter Frei (born 6 August 1946 in Davos) is a Swiss former alpine skier who competed in the 1968 Winter Olympics.

Career 
He raced for the SC Davos.

At the Lauberhorn ski races in 1968 he skied with the number 162 on the fifth place at the slalom.

In the 1968–69 FIS Alpine Ski World Cup he was third at the slalom of the Lauberhorn ski races.

In January 1970 he won the slalom at the "Coupe Vitranc".

In the off-season he rides bicycle.

Private 
He was a civil engineer and his hobbies are mountain tours and swimming.

References

External links
 sports-reference.com

1946 births
Living people
People from Davos
Swiss male alpine skiers
Olympic alpine skiers of Switzerland
Alpine skiers at the 1968 Winter Olympics
Sportspeople from Graubünden